Bobby Noble, aka Jean Bobby Noble or J. Bobby Noble, is a professor at York University in Toronto, Ontario, Canada. He is the author of the books Masculinities Without Men? and Sons of the Movement and is one of the foremost scholars of transgender studies in North America.

Works
Books
 
 

Chapters in books 
 

Journal articles

External links
Bobby Noble's bio on York University's web site

Year of birth missing (living people)
Living people
Men and masculinities scholars
Academic staff of York University